Kevin John Hoyos Manzur (born 25 February 1993 in Fountain Valley, United States) is an American professional soccer player who plays as a midfielder for Honduran club Marathón.

Career 
Kevin Hoyos was born in Fountain Valley, California, United States, a June 20, 1991. He is son of Argentine parents and brother of the also footballer Michael Hoyos. In 2006, he and his brother began to play with a youth club in their hometown in the U.S., the Irvine Strikers.   After three years with the Strikers, both Hoyos brothers moved to West Coast FC, where they spent two years before transferring to Estudiantes de La Plata, the club with which both debuted professionally.  After three and a half years with Estudiantes, Kevin left the club in July 2013 and joined C.D. Victoria in Honduras.

Personal 
His parents were from Don Torcuato in Buenos Aires province. Hoyos, who holds dual USA-Argentine citizenship, is the third USA player to play in the Argentine top league, after Renato Corsi, who played for Argentinos Juniors and other teams in the 1980s, and Bryan Gerzicich, who played for Arsenal in 2006. His older brother, Michael, is also American and currently plays for OFI Crete in the Superleague Greece.

References

External links 
 
 
 Kevin Hoyos at BDFA

1993 births
Living people
American soccer players
American expatriate soccer players
Estudiantes de La Plata footballers
CSyD Tristán Suárez footballers
C.D. Victoria players
C.D.S. Vida players
Club Atlético Villa San Carlos footballers
Club Atlético Fénix players
Parrillas One players
Club Atlético San Miguel footballers
Liga Nacional de Fútbol Profesional de Honduras players
Primera B Metropolitana players
Torneo Argentino A players
Expatriate footballers in Argentina
Expatriate footballers in Honduras
Association football midfielders
C.D. Marathón players